Mercyland is the fourth studio album by American rock band Cowboy Mouth. It was their second album on the (MCA) label.  It produced the single "Whatcha Gonna Do?" which also charted on the Billboard charts.

Track listing
 "Why Ya Wanna Do Me?"   2:36
 "Lovers Or Friends"   3:52
 "Little Blue One"   2:40
 "Drummer Man"   4:11
 "Turn Me On"   3:57
 "Whatcha Gonna Do?"   3:12
 "Only One Of Us"   3:04
 "Everyone Is Waiting"   3:10
 "Great Wide Open World"   3:35
 "I Want To Believe"   4:12
 "Shotgun In My Soul"   3:00
 "Crazy 'Bout Ya"   2:57
 "Out Of My Way Back To You"   3:34
 "Bad"   3:47

References

External links

 'Mercyland' Album Page

1998 albums
Cowboy Mouth albums
MCA Records albums